HMS Amberley Castle was a  of the United Kingdom's Royal Navy. She was named after Amberley Castle near Arundel in West Sussex.

Construction
Laid down at S.P. Austin & Son Ltd. shipyard in Sunderland on 31 May 1943 she was launched on 27 November 1943 and commissioned on 24 November 1944.

World War II
She served as a convoy escort until the end of the war (escorting 15 convoys in 1945) when she was put into reserve at Portsmouth until 1952.

Weather ship
She was in reserve at Penarth from 1953 until 1957 when she was converted to a weather ship at Blyth in Northumberland and renamed to Weather Advisor in a ceremony on 22 September 1960 at the James Watt Dock, Greenock by Lady Sutton, wife of Sir Graham Sutton, the then director-general of the Met Office. She replaced the ship known as Weather Observer, which had carried out the role since 1947.

She served in this role from 28 September 1960 onwards until she was again extensively updated in July 1976 at Manchester dry docks, and renamed Admiral Fitzroy after the British vice-admiral Robert FitzRoy, the first director of the forerunner to the British Meteorological Office.

Fate
The ship was finally scrapped at Troon in 1982.

References

External links
Weather Adviser at www.weatherships.co.uk, including several pictures.

Publications
 

 

Castle-class corvettes
1943 ships